The 1972 LPGA Tour was the 23rd season since the LPGA Tour officially began in 1950. The season ran from January 5 to November 5. The season consisted of 29 official money events. Kathy Whitworth won the most tournaments, five. Whitworth led the money list with earnings of $65,063.

The season saw the first tournament with a $100,000 purse, the Dinah Shore Colgate Winner's Circle ($110,000). It also saw the first player to win over $50,000 in a season, Whitworth. There were two first-time winners in 1972: Betty Burfeindt and Betsy Cullen. This season saw the return, for 1972 only, of the LPGA major, the Titleholders Championship. It also saw the last of Betsy Rawls' 55 LPGA wins.

The tournament results and award winners are listed below.

Tournament results
The following table shows all the official money events for the 1972 season. "Date" is the ending date of the tournament. The numbers in parentheses after the winners' names are the number of wins they had on the tour up to and including that event. Majors are shown in bold.

^ - weather-shortened tournament

Jane Blalock suspension and lawsuit

After she finished the second round of the Bluegrass Invitational held in Louisville, Kentucky, Jane Blalock was disqualified for signing an incorrect scorecard. Tourney director Gene McAuliff said Blalock did not mark her ball properly on the 17th green and then failed to take a two-stroke penalty for the infraction as required.

Less than two weeks later, the LPGA executive board suspended Blalock for one year "for actions inconsistent with the code of ethics of the organization". The executive board claimed Blalock had been under suspicion for over a year, that she had moved her ball illegally on multiple occasions and that there were witnesses to these happenings, plus that Blalock had admitted to her guilt. Twenty-seven other LPGA Tour players signed a petition arguing that probation, a fine, and disqualification from the Louisville tournament were not enough punishment. LPGA Executive Director Bud Erickson asked Blalock to feign a back injury so to avoid bad publicity but she refused.

Fellow LPGA Tour golfer Sandra Palmer defended Blalock. In addition to saying she had never seen Blalock commit any rules violations,  Palmer stated she didn't understand why the alleged infractions weren't reported at the time they happened and why other players signed Blalock's scorecards without reporting the incidents. Palmer also said, "If you see an infraction of the rules, you should point it out immediately. You don't wait until three years later to report something. Once you've signed that card, you're as guilty as the person who committed the violation." The LPGA executive went on to warn Palmer in regards to her statements. Palmer was also placed on probation for one year by the LPGA Tour and ordered not to make further statements of support for Jane Blalock.

Jane Blalock filed a lawsuit against the LPGA Tour. In the suit, Blalock's lawyers motioned the court asking that Blalock be allowed to continue playing while the suit was resolved. U.S. District Court Judge Charles A. Moye Jr. granted the motion. Moye did however rule that any money Blalock earned while her case was being resolved would be placed in a court trust.  Blalock went on to win two more times in 1972, at the Dallas Civitan Open and the Lady Errol Classic.

Awards

References

External links
LPGA Tour official site
1972 season coverage at golfobserver.com

LPGA Tour seasons
LPGA Tour